Acrobasis hemiargyralis is a species of snout moth in the genus Acrobasis. It was described by George Hampson in 1908. It is found in India.

References

Moths described in 1908
Acrobasis
Moths of Asia